Maschera (Italian: mask) may refer to:

Maschera (band), a Japanese band
Maschera, a genre of music introduced from Italy to Germany by William Brade
La maschera, a film by Fiorella Infascelli (1988)
Fiorenzo Maschera (1540-1584), Italian composer

See also
 Un ballo in maschera, an 1859 opera by Giuseppe Verdi